Gentlemen of the Press is a three-act play written by Ward Morehouse. Producers Thomas E. Jackson and H. S. Kraft opened it on Broadway at Henry Miller's Theatre on August 27, 1928. George Abbott directed the production, which ran for 128 performances.

The play is a comedy about Wick Snell, a journalist who decides to take a job as a publicist for a real estate firm. After a dispute with his new boss, Snell goes back to journalism.

Morehouse was a journalist who had worked for several different newspapers. The main character in Gentlemen of the Press was inspired by one of his co-workers who frequently complained about the difficulties of working in journalism.

Cast and characters
The characters and opening night cast from the Broadway production are given below:

Adaptations
Paramount Pictures adapted the play as a film of the same name in 1929, directed by Millard Webb. Walter Huston starred as Snell.

References

External links
 

1928 plays
American plays adapted into films
Broadway plays
Comedy plays
Plays set in New York City